"Te Amo Tanto" (English: I Love You So Much) is the official second  and final single from Flex second studio album La Evolución Romantic Style. A R&B version was released later in 2009.

Charts

References 

2009 singles
Flex (singer) songs
Songs written by Flex (singer)
2009 songs
EMI Latin singles